The 1977 Houston Oilers season was the 18th season overall and eighth with the National Football League (NFL). The Oilers won three of their first four games, which was capped by a 27–10 win over the Pittsburgh Steelers in the Astrodome. However, injuries would hamper the Oilers chances as they lost five of their next six games. The team improved upon their previous season's output of 5–9, winning eight games, but failed to qualify for the playoffs for the eighth consecutive season.

Offseason

NFL draft

Roster

Schedule

Standings

References

External links
 1977 Houston Oilers at Pro-Football-Reference.com

Houston Oilers seasons
Houston Oilers
Houston